The West Michigan ThunderHawks were an indoor football team based in Grand Rapids, Michigan. The team was most recently a member of the Indoor Football League. From their inception in 2007 until 2009, the ThunderHawks were known as the Muskegon Thunder and played at L.C. Walker Arena (in their first two seasons they played in the Continental Indoor Football League). In 2010, the team moved to Grand Rapids, MI. This is where the downfall of the team took place. The season started off hopeful with a 5–2 record. After week 7 the players were promised money at a later date as long as they played (money that they never received). Starting in 2010 the ThunderHawks played their home games at the DeltaPlex Arena, in nearby Walker, Michigan. The Thunderhawks did not field a team in 2011.

Franchise history

2007
For their first season, the Thunder had Shane Fairfield as head coach. Fairfield was an accomplished local high school football coach, as he led the Holton Red Devils to a conference championship as well as two back to back district championships against Muskegon Catholic. Prior to that he coached his alma mater Muskegon Catholic Central, and Muskegon High School.

For their first season with their brand-new identity, the head coach and defensive coordinator was Detroit native, Terry Foster. Foster was once a star for the Grand Valley State University team, and played in the Arena Football League for the Grand Rapids Rampage. In 2006, Foster was an assistant coach for the Rampage. Offensive coordinator Brent White almost mirrored Fairfield's path from Muskegon to Holton, playing for the Big Reds from 1999 to 2002 and then stepping off the field as assistant JV coach at Holton. Soon afterwards, he quickly became offensive coordinator for the Holton Red Devils, where he led his team to some record-breaking performances.

Schedule

Standings

2008

Schedule

Standings

2009
On January 18, 2009, Adam Pringle, a former player who started at Nose Guard, part-owner of the club, and son of the club's president, died from injuries sustained in a snowmobile accident.

2010

Season-by-season results

Notable players
 Stephen Wasil - QB
 Cullen Finnerty - QB

References

External links 
 Official website
 Thunder's 2007 stats

 
2007 establishments in Michigan
2010 disestablishments in Michigan
American football teams established in 2007
American football teams disestablished in 2010
Sports in Grand Rapids, Michigan
Defunct American football teams
American football teams in Michigan
Defunct sports teams in Michigan